Jonathan McNiven is an American politician who was a Republican member of the Montana Legislature.  He was elected to the Montana House of Representatives for House District 44 in November 2010 which represents a portion of the Yellowstone County area. McNiven was re-elected to his house district for a 2nd 2-year term in 2012.

Representative McNiven has served on the following Legislative Committees

Committee Assignments – Committee Role – Session 

(H) Business and Labor Committee Member – 2011, 2013 Legislative Session 
(H) Education Committee Member – 2011, 2013 Legislative Session 
(H) Ethics Committee(Vice Chair) – 2013 Legislative Session 
(H) Local Government Committee Member – 2013 Legislative Session 
(H) Subcommittee on Educational Truancy Member 
(H) Agriculture Committee – 2011 Legislative Session

References

External links
  Jonathan McNiven Website

Living people
Republican Party members of the Montana House of Representatives
Arizona State University alumni
1978 births
21st-century American politicians
People from Yellowstone County, Montana